The 2015 Davis Cup was the 104th edition of the Davis Cup, a tournament between national teams in men's tennis.  It was sponsored by BNP Paribas.  Great Britain won their tenth title (their first since 1936), with Andy Murray defeating David Goffin of Belgium on clay in the final match held at Flanders Expo located in Ghent on 29 November 2015.

World Group

Seeds

Draw

Final
Belgium and Great Britain won through to the final by winning semi-final ties against Argentina and Australia respectively. This meant that Belgium would participate in their first Davis Cup final since 1904 (a 5–0 defeat against Great Britain), and Great Britain in their first since 1978.<Ref name = "1978 final"></</ref> It also marked a remarkable recovery in fortunes for Great Britain, who had been in danger of relegation to the lowest division of the Davis Cup in 2010.

Belgium were drawn as the home team under the rotation policy used by the organizers. They chose to play the tie on a clay surface in the Flanders Expo, an indoor arena in Ghent. The Belgians opted for a clay surface in the hope of unsettling Andy Murray, the highest ranked player on either side. The choice of surface led Murray to question whether he would participate in the 2015 ATP World Tour Finals, played on a hard court in the week before the Davis Cup final, due to the difficulty in transitioning between surfaces. Murray's comments led ITF executive president Chris Kermode to state that the Tour Finals was a mandatory event. Murray participated in the finals, but was eliminated during the group stage.

On the weekend before the tie, transport systems in the capital city of Brussels were shut down by the Belgian authorities due to security concerns relating to the recent attacks in Paris. The British team delayed travelling to Belgium by 24 hours due to the security concerns, with the venue being located 35 km (22 mi) from Brussels.

For his squad, Belgium captain Johan Van Herck selected Kimmer Coppejans, Ruben Bemelmans, Steve Darcis and David Goffin. The team was led by Goffin, ranked 16th in the world and possessing a strong record in Davis Cup singles matches. Their selection was relatively straightforward, as no other Belgian players possessed significant Davis Cup experience or were ranked in the top 200. Great Britain captain Leon Smith named a five-man provisional squad of Murray, his brother Jamie, James Ward, Kyle Edmund and Dominic Inglot. The team was led by Andy Murray, ranked second in the world and likely to play in the doubles match with his brother. Smith later reduced the squad by omitting Inglot, a specialist doubles player who would only have been used if either Murray had been injured. 

Smith opted to use Edmund in the opening singles instead of Ward, due to his recent success in winning an ATP Challenger Tour event held on clay (the 2015 Copa Fila). This meant that Edmund made his Davis Cup debut in the final, becoming only the sixth player in tournament history to make his debut in a final. Edmund made a flying start to the first singles tie, racing into a two-set lead against Goffin by hitting many forehand winners. Goffin fought back to win in five sets, winning 14 of the last 15 games. Murray levelled the tie by winning in straight sets against Bemelmans. Smith commented that it was the score that would have been expected after the first day, with the two higher-ranked players winning their matches.

With the tie standing level after the first day, Belgian captain Van Herck gambled by selecting Goffin for the doubles (alongside Darcis) instead of Bemelmans. This was an attempt to win the tie by winning the doubles and the two singles matches not contested by Andy Murray. Van Herck also justified his decision by saying he felt they would have a better chance to win by playing from the back of the court, instead of playing a more typical doubles match at the net. The tactic appeared to work, as the Belgian pair won the second set to level the match and then took an early lead in the third. Darcis weakened later in the match and his serve was broken later in the third set, won 6–3 by the Murrays. After Jamie survived seven break points on his serve midway through the fourth set, the Darcis serve was broken again. Andy then closed out the victory, giving Great Britain a 2–1 lead.

Going into the final day, Belgium hoped that Goffin would defeat Andy Murray and force the tie into a decisive fifth rubber. The teams would then have faced an open choice of the other team members for that match, with Edmund nominally scheduled to play Bemelmans. Goffin had only won one game in a recent meeting with Murray, but gave him a much harder match, which ran to almost three hours. Murray survived a break point at 2–2 in the first set, but then raced to a 5–2 lead. Goffin survived three set points on his own serve, but Murray then clinched the set in his next service game. Goffin again resisted pressure on his own serve for most of the second set, but was broken in the 11th game. Murray held serve to win the second set. Goffin then fought back by breaking the Murray serve early in the third set, but was then immediately broken himself. Murray then raced to victory, winning the match on his second match point with a backhand lob. This gave Great Britain an unassailable 3–1 lead, with the two teams opting not to play the dead fifth rubber.

The win was Great Britain's first Davis Cup victory since 1936, when Fred Perry and Bunny Austin contributed to a final win against Australia. Andy Murray became only the third player, after John McEnroe and Mats Wilander, to win the maximum eight singles matches in a Davis Cup tournament. With his three victories in doubles matches with his brother, he also became only the fourth man to win 11 points in a tournament.

Summary

World Group play-offs

Date: 18–20 September

The eight losing teams in the World Group, first round ties, and eight winners of the Zonal Group I final round ties competed in the World Group play-offs for spots in the 2016 World Group. 

Seeded teams

 
 
 
 
 
 
 
 

Unseeded teams

 
 
 
 
 
 
 
 

 was promoted to the World Group in 2016.
 was relegated to Zonal Group I in 2016.

Americas Zone

Group I

Seeds: 
All seeds and Uruguay received a bye into the second round. 

 
 

Remaining nations:

Draw

Group II

Seeds:
 
 
 
 

Remaining nations:

Draw

Group III

Date: 20–25 July

Location: Panama City, Panama (clay)

Group A

Group B

7th-place play-off

  2–0 

5th-place play-off

  2–0 

Promotion play-off

  2–0 
  2–0 

 and  promoted to Group II in 2016.

Asia/Oceania Zone

Group I

Seeds:
All seeds received a bye into the second round.
 
 

Remaining nations:

Draw

Group II

Seeds:
 
 
 
 

Remaining nations:

Draw

Group III

Date: 25–28 March

Location: Kuala Lumpur, Malaysia (hard)

Seeds

Group A

Group B

Relegation play-off

  1–2 
  3–0 

† and  relegated to Group IV in 2016.

† Relegation to Group IV were ultimately not enforced.

Promotion play-off

  2–0 
  2–0 

 and  promoted to Group II in 2016.

Group IV

Date: 27 April–2 May

Location: Isa Town, Bahrain (hard)

Seeds

Group A

Group B

7th-place play-off

  2–1 

5th-place play-off

  1–2 

Promotion play-off

  2–1 
  2–0 

 and  promoted to Group III in 2016.

Europe/Africa Zone

Group I

Seeds:
The top three seeds received a bye into the second round.

 
 
 
 

Remaining nations:

Draw

Group II

Seeds:
 
 
 
 
 
 
 
 

Remaining nations:

Draw

Group III Europe
Date: 15–18 July

Location: City of San Marino, San Marino (clay)

Seeds:

 
 
 
 

Remaining nations:

 
 
 
 
 

 
 
 
 

Group A

Group B

Group C

Group D

9th to 12th-place play-off

  2–0 
  2–1 

5th to 8th-place play-off

  0–2 
  2–1 

Promotion play-off

  0–2 
  0–2 

 and  promoted to Group II in 2016.

Group III Africa

Date: 26–29 October

Location: Cairo, Egypt (clay)

Group A

Group B

7th-place play-off

  2–0 

5th-place play-off

  2–1 

Promotion play-off

  2–0 
  2–0 

 and  promoted to Group II in 2016.

References

External links
Official website

 
Davis Cup
Davis Cups by year